Pete Sampras defeated Boris Becker in the final, 7–6(7–5), 6–4, 6–4 to win the singles tennis title at the 1995 Paris Open.

Andre Agassi was the reigning champion, but did not participate this year.

Seeds
All sixteen seeds receive a bye into the second round.

Draw

Finals

Section 1

Section 2

Section 3

Section 4

External links
 1995 Paris Open Singles draw

Singles